Haggart Lake is a lake in geographic Haggart Township, Cochrane District in Northeastern Ontario, Canada. It is in the James Bay drainage basin.

The primary inflow, at the south, and outflow, at the north, is Haggart Creek. Haggart Creek flows via the Poplar Rapids River, the Mattagami River and the Moose River to James Bay.

See also
List of lakes in Ontario

References

Lakes of Cochrane District